Jangam Station is the northern terminus of the Seoul Subway Line 7, and is the only station on this line to be located outside the northern precincts of Seoul. This station is located within the train servicing depot, and has the lowest ridership out of all Line 7 stations. Much of the demand for this station comes from people hiking nearby Mt. Surak on weekends.

Station layout

References

Metro stations in Uijeongbu
Seoul Metropolitan Subway stations
Railway stations opened in 1996